Gong Lei (born 26 March 1983) is a Chinese sailor. He competed at the 2012 Summer Olympics in the Men's Finn class.

References

Living people
Olympic sailors of China
Chinese male sailors (sport)
Sailors at the 2012 Summer Olympics – Finn
Sportspeople from Shandong
1983 births
Sailors at the 2016 Summer Olympics – Finn
21st-century Chinese people